Eupithecia hreblayi is a moth in the family Geometridae that is endemic to Thailand.

The forewings are a combination of pale ash grey and pale rusty brownish and the hindwings are whitish grey with a brownish tinge.

References

External links

Moths described in 2009
Endemic fauna of Thailand
Moths of Asia
hreblayi